Jack Martin is the Co-Chairman and Co-CEO of Martin+Crumpton Group, a global management consulting and strategic advisory firm. He previously served as the global executive chairman and chief executive officer of Hill+Knowlton Strategies, a global public relations consultancy, and a former Democratic consultant. He is also a board member of the Smithsonian Institution's National Museum of American History. Martin is a former chairman of the Texas State University System Board of Regents and has served on the LBJ Foundation's board of trustees. The foundation supports the LBJ Presidential Library and LBJ School of Public Affairs. Jack Martin also serves as the Chairman of the Board of Trustees for Baylor Scott and White hospital system.

Early life
Jack Martin was born in Taylor, Texas and grew up in San Antonio, Texas. He attended Texas State University (then known as Southwest Texas State University), where he studied political science. While at the Southwest Texas State, he became involved with the school's student senate. He later became chairman of the student senate and met former President Lyndon B. Johnson, a prominent alumnus of the school, through that office.

Career
Martin began serving as an assistant sergeant at arms at the Texas Capitol while studying at Southwest Texas State. Shortly thereafter, two years following his meeting Johnson, a Johnson aide introduced Martin to then-United States Senator Lloyd Bentsen. Martin left school to take a job as travel aide during Bentsen's campaign for the 1976 Democratic presidential nomination.

Following Bentsen's 1976 campaign for the Democratic presidential nomination, Martin helped direct the campaign of then-state Attorney General and Democratic gubernatorial nominee John Luke Hill during the 1978 Democratic primary and Texas gubernatorial general election. John Hill beat incumbent Governor Dolph Briscoe in the Democratic primary by running a progressive campaign, but lost in the general election to Republican Bill Clements. The 1978 election was the first time since Reconstruction that a Republican won the governorship of Texas.

In 1982, the 28-year-old Martin led the Democratic coordinated campaign for all state elections while also heading Bentsen's successful reelection campaign for the United States Senate. That year Democrats swept statewide offices and incumbent Republican Governor Bill Clements lost in the general election to Democrat Mark White. Other Democrats who won office that year include Jim Maddox for attorney general, Ann Richards for state treasurer, Garry Mauro for land commissioner, and Jim Hightower for agriculture commissioner.

Governor Mark White appointed Martin to a six-year term on the Texas State University System Board of Regents in 1985. The board of regents oversaw the system's member institutions, which at the time were Angelo State University, Sam Houston State University, Sul Ross State University, and Southwest Texas State University (now Texas State University), Martin's alma mater. Martin became chairman of the board in 1988 and served on the board in that capacity until his term expired in 1991. Martin received the Southwest Texas State University Distinguished Alumni award following his regency.

In 1988, Martin led Bentsen's successful reelection campaign for the United States Senate. Later that year Martin founded Public Strategies, a public affairs and communication firm, with the help of Matthew Dowd, who served as company president and oversaw its day-to-day operations. The firm was financed with a small loan Martin secured on farmland that he had inherited from his father. He purchased the name Public Strategies from James Johnson and Richard Holbrooke for $1. Johnson and Holbrooke had previously owned a consultancy of the same name, which they sold to Lehman Brothers in the early 1980s. The two later served as members of Public Strategies' advisory board.

Public Strategies' first client was Southwest Airlines, whose co-founder, Herb Kelleher, was a friend of Bentsen. The firm continued to work in Democratic politics during the early 1990s. Public Strategies worked on the campaigns of Democratic candidates during the 1990 Texas election cycle, including winners Governor Ann Richards, Lt. Governor Bob Bullock, and Attorney General Dan Morales. Martin chaired Richards' gubernatorial transition team following her election. The firm also advised national Democratic leadership, with Martin serving as an adviser to the Democratic Senatorial Campaign Committee and the chairman of the Democratic National Committee. By 1994, the firm decided to move away from partisan politics and concentrate solely on corporations and business groups.

Martin remained chairman of the Public Strategies following its 2006 acquisition by the WPP Group. Four years later, in November 2010, WPP Group merged Public Strategies with Hill & Knowlton, another communications firm it owned. Martin became global chairman of the newly merged Hill & Knowlton and was appointed global chief executive officer of the firm in January 2011. Hill & Knowlton was renamed Hill+Knowlton Strategies in December 2011.

Personal life
Martin is married to Patsy Woods Martin, a former regent of Texas Tech University.

References

Texas State University alumni
American businesspeople
Living people
People from Taylor, Texas
Year of birth missing (living people)